WRF-SFIRE is a coupled atmosphere-wildfire model, which combines the Weather Research and Forecasting Model (WRF) with a fire-spread model, implemented by the level-set method. A version from 2010 was released based on the WRF 3.2 as WRF-Fire.

References
 Coen, J., M. Cameron, J. Michalakes,  E. Patton, P. Riggan, and K. Yedinak,  2013: WRF-Fire: Coupled Weather-Wildland Fire Modeling with the Weather Research and Forecasting Model. J. Appl. Meteorol. Climatol. 52, 16-38, .
 Jan Mandel, Jonathan D. Beezley, Janice L. Coen, Minjeong Kim, Data Assimilation for Wildland Fires: Ensemble Kalman filters in coupled atmosphere-surface models, IEEE Control Systems Magazine 29, Issue 3, June 2009, 47-65.
 Jan Mandel, Jonathan D. Beezley, and Adam K. Kochanski, Coupled atmosphere-wildland fire modeling with WRF 3.3 and SFIRE 2011, Geoscientific Model Development (GMD) 4, 591-610, 2011.

External links
 Users guide

Wildfires
Computational physics
Firefighting
Mathematical modeling
National Weather Service numerical models